The Master of Death is a 1926 German silent film directed by Hans Steinhoff and starring Alfred Solm, Hertha von Walther and Simone Vaudry.

The film's art direction was by Robert Neppach.

Cast
 Alfred Solm as Peter von Hersdorff
 Hertha von Walther as Maja
 Simone Vaudry as Heid von Duren
 Eduard von Winterstein as Colonel von Hersdorff
 Heinrich Peer as Privy councillor von Duren
 Erna Hauk as Daisy, Brown
 Jenny Marba as Mrs von Hersdorff
 Hedwig Pauly-Winterstein as Privy Councillor von Duren's wife
 Ferdinand von Alten as Baron von Bassenheim
 S.Z. Sakall as Bordoni
 Fritz Sohn

References

External links

1926 films
Films of the Weimar Republic
German silent feature films
Films directed by Hans Steinhoff
UFA GmbH films
German black-and-white films
Films with screenplays by Hans Székely
1920s German films